Niphona falaizei is a species of beetle in the family Cerambycidae. It was described by Stephan von Breuning in 1962. It is known from Thailand and Laos.

References

falaizei
Beetles described in 1962